Events in the year 1957 in Norway.

Incumbents
 Monarch – Haakon VII (until September 21), then Olav V
 Regent – Olav (until September 21)
 Prime Minister – Einar Gerhardsen (Labour Party)

Events

 16 March – The Kongsberg Silver Mines closes.
 21 March – The Soviet Union threatened to use nuclear weapons if foreign military bases were established in Norway.
 21 September – King Haakon VII dies
 7 October – The 1957 Parliamentary election takes place.
 16 December – During a NATO meeting in Paris, Prime Minister Einar Gerhardsen declares that Norway will not allow nuclear weapons or foreign bases on Norwegian soil.

Popular culture

Sports

Music

Film

Literature
Fuglane, novel by Tarjei Vesaas

Notable births

January 
 

2 January – Haldis Lenes, competitive rower.
5 January – 
Torbjørn Andersen, politician
Rolf Gramstad, speedway rider
8 January – Christian Eggen, composer, pianist and conductor.
11 January – Håvard Moen, footballer
30 January – Inger Lise Husøy, trade unionist and politician

February 
 

4 February – Anne Krigsvoll, actress.
6 February – Sven Nordin, actor
7 February – Knut Jøran Helmers, chess player
10 February – Hallvard Flatland, television presenter
11 February – Oddmund Finnseth, jazz musician
13 February – Inger Marie Gundersen, jazz vocalist
14 February – Terje Totland, high jumper

March 
 

1 March – 
Grete Brochmann, sociologist
Olav Njølstad, historian.
3 March – Liv Bernhoft Osa, actress.
5 March – Per Roar Bredvold, politician
11 March – Per Barth Lilje, astronomer
15 March – Roger Albertsen, footballer (died 2003).
17 March – Mari Maurstad, actress.
19 March – Øystein Sevåg, musician
26 March – Randi Langøigjelten, middle-distance runner
28 March – Rune Ulvestad, footballer
29 March – Anne Grete Hollup, writer.

April 
 

3 April – Anne Krafft, visual artist
6 April – Terje Mikkelsen, conductor
9 April – Geir Borgan Paulsen, weightlifter
11 April – Bjørn Tronstad, footballer
12 April – Hallvar Thoresen, footballer.
14 April – Rolf Åge Berg, ski jumper
15 April – Thor Egil Olsen, coxswain
20 April – 
Kristin Clemet, politician and Minister.
Dag Vidar Kristoffersen, footballer
22 April – Lene Jenssen, competitive swimmer.
23 April – 
Jarl Goli, actor, painter and television personality
Hege Peikli, cross-country skier.

May 
 
 

4 May – Jarle Halsnes, alpine skier.
5 May – 
Gene Dalby, poet
Siri Hatlen, businesswoman
11 May – 
Niels Fredrik Dahl, novelist, poet and playwright.
Synnøve Solbakken, politician
17 May – 
Lillian Hansen, politician
Arne Nygaard, organizational theorist
22 May – 
Anne Grete Preus, singer (died 2019)
Hege Schøyen, singer, actor and comedian
23 May – Lars Sponheim, politician
26 May – Ingebjørg Godskesen, politician
27 May – Dag Terje Andersen, politician
31 May – Ole Christian Bach, con artist (died 2005)

June 
 

13 June – Anne Berit Eid, orienteering competitor.
19 June – Eirik Ildahl, comics writer, scriptwriter, playwright and novelist
21 June – Kjell Søbak, biathlete
22 June – Atle Torbjørn Karlsvik, naval officer
25 June – Eddie Kalleklev, sprint canoer
26 June – Astrid Tveit, high jumper
28 June – Dag Mejdell, businessman.
29 June – Jon Ewo, writer.

July 
 

1 July – Pål Sandli, rower
2 July – Jan Otto Myrseth, prelate
5 July – 
Trond H. Diseth, child psychiatrist
Tom Levorstad, ski jumper
10 July – Iselin Alme, singer and actress
12 July – Fredrik Carl Størmer, jazz drummer and entrepreneur
16 July – Atle Teigland, trade unionist 
17 July – Njål Vindenes, musician
23 July – Olav Hansson, ski jumper
25 July – Tor Helness, bridge player
26 July – Nils Tore Føreland, politician
27 July – 
Kurt Oddekalv, environmentalist (died 2021).
Jørn Hoel, composer, guitarist and singer. 
Ellen Schlichting, gastroenterological surgeon 
29 July – Otto Ulseth, footballer and journalist
30 July – Eirik Jensen, former policeman

August 
 

4 August – Øystein Langholm Hansen, trade unionist and politician
6 August – Tor Brostigen, politician 
8 August – Bente A. Landsnes, business executive
10 August – Elin Rodum Agdestein, politician.
12 August – Ellen Marie Vars, writer.
16 August – Terje Kojedal, footballer
17 August – Dag Henrik Sandbakken, politician
20 August – Hans Sverre Sjøvold, police chief and civil servant.
30 August – Anne Lise Ådnøy, prelate

September 

4 September – Sylvelin Vatle, writer.
7 September – Rolf Wallin, musician
12 September – 
Jan Egeland, diplomat, political scientist, humanitarian leader and politician
Arvid Libak, politician
22 September – John G. Bernander, politician and media executive
23 September – Sigurd Thinn, ice hockey player.
25 September – Morten Qvale, photographer
27 September – Tone Hulbækmo, musician
28 September – 
Torry Pedersen, newspaper editor.
Ernst-Wiggo Sandbakk, jazz musician

October 
 

1 October – Arne Brimi, chef.
4 October – Yngve Moe, musician (died 2013)
7 October – Finn Øglænd, writer
8 October – Claudia Scott, singer
12 October – Trond Helge Torsvik, geophysicist
13 October – Øivind Løsåmoen, ice hockey player.
14 October – Morten Aasen, equestrian
18 October – Erik Loe, sports official
22 October – 
Else Berit Eikeland, diplomat.
Hilde Indreberg, judge

November 
 

1 November – Anne Grethe Jeppesen, sport shooter.
2 November – Erling Havnå, kickboxer and convicted criminal
5 November – Anette Bøe, cross-country skier.
15 November – Jon Grunde Vegard, diver.
16 November – Kirsten Borgen, sport wrestler.
30 November – Morten Brekke, sport wrestler

December 
 
 

2 December – Dagfinn Høybråten, politician
3 December – Anne B. Ragde, writer.
6 December – 
Eva Vinje Aurdal, politician
Lars Egeland, librarian and politician
14 December – 
Steinar Aspli, politician
Runar Tafjord, musician
21 December Olaug Svarva, economist.
23 December – 
Kjell Lars Berge, linguist
Svein Richard Brandtzæg, chemist and business executive 
30 December – Stein Versto, poet, novelist, translator and folk musician.

Full date missing
Åsmund Asdal, biologist and agronomist
Annika Biørnstad, media executive.
Leonard Borgzinner, essayist, political philosopher, science fiction author, illustrator and fanzine editor (died 1990)
Henrik Bull, judge
Freddy Fjellheim, author
John Grue, applied mathematician  
Tine Jensen, psychologist
Jan Knudsen, crime fiction writer
Siri Røine, civil servant
Tom Stalsberg, journalist
Marit Elisebet Totland, politician

Notable deaths

 

28 January – Harry Lundeberg, merchant seaman and labour leader in America (born 1901) 
29 January – Mimi Falsen, painter (born 1861)
17 February – Wilhelm Preus Sommerfeldt, bibliographer and librarian (born 1881)
24 February – John A. Schefte, newspaper editor and politician (born 1872)
6 March – Hans Jacob Nilsen, actor, theatre director and film director (born 1897)
9 March – Otto Delphin Amundsen, genealogist (born 1896)
15 March – Just Knud Qvigstad,  philologist, linguist, ethnographer, historian and cultural historian (born 1853)
29 March – Laurits Grønland, politician (born 1887)
5 April – Arne Leonhard Nilsen, politician (born 1893)
22 April – Mikkjel Hemmestveit, Nordic skier (born 1863)
3 May – Kristian Schreiner, professor of medicine (born 1874)
5 May – Olaf Løhre, politician (born 1877).
24 May – Rasmus Pettersen, gymnast and Olympic gold medallist (born 1877)
22 June – Anders Beggerud, civil servant during the Nazi regime (born 1894)
12 July – James Maroni, theologian and priest, Bishop of the Diocese of Agder (born 1873)
27 July – Eivind Blehr, government minister in the NS government during the German occupation of Norway (born 1881)
29 July – Arnold Carl Johansen, politician (born 1898)
2 August – Carsten Tank-Nielsen, naval officer (born 1877)
5 August – Tilla Valstad, teacher, novelist and journalist (born 1871)
13 August – Carl Størmer, mathematician and physicist (born 1874)
19 August – Hans Prydz, physician and politician (born 1868)
21 August – 
Henrik Østervold, sailor and Olympic gold medallist (born 1878).
Harald Sverdrup, oceanographer and meteorologist (born 1888)
7 September – Bjørn Helland-Hansen, oceanographer (born 1877)
10 September – Hallvard Devold, Arctic explorer, trapper and meteorologist (born 1898)
20 September – Edvard Bræin, organist, composer, and orchestra conductor (born 1887)
21 September – 
Olaf Bjerke, trade unionist and politician (born 1893)
Haakon VII of Norway, King of Norway (born 1872)
27 September – Nicolai Rygg, economist (born 1872)
28 September – Arnt J. Mørland, ship-owner, resistance member, and politician (born 1888)
24 October –
Andreas Claussen, barrister, civil servant and politician (born 1883)
Hans Endrerud, footballer (born 1885)
26 October – Sverre Krogh, actuary, newspaper editor and politician (born 1883) 
29 October – Roar Tank, educator and local historian (born 1880)
1 November – Olav Kjetilson Nylund, politician (born 1903)
17 November – Harald Herlofson, rower (born 1887)
19 November – Christian Leden, ethno-musicologist and composer (born 1882)
23 November – Andreas Fleischer, theologian, missionary to China, and Lutheran Bishop (born 1878)
1 December – Magnus Vigrestad, sculptor (born 1887)
2 December – Tellef Wagle, competitive sailor (born 1883)
4 December – Magnus Falkberget, actor and artistic director (born 1900)
13 December – Erling Bühring-Dehli, newspaper editor and politician (born 1887)
14 December – Audun Rusten, swimmer (born 1894)
18 December – Thomas Refsum, sport shooter (born 1878)
20 December – Carl Keilhau, journalist and poet (born 1919)
25 December – Yngvar Fredriksen, gymnast (born 1887)

Full date missing
Anders Beer, businessman (born 1875)
Gustav Berg-Jæger, journalist and Nazi collaborator (born 1884)
Erling Eriksen, film director, screenwriter, and film producer (born 1878)
Andreas Fredrik Falkenberg, engineer, businessperson and politician (born 1875)
Hartvig Johannson, businessman (born 1875)
Arne Juland, educator (born 1877)
Carl Rustad, military officer and businessman (born 1881)
Halvor Saamundsen, politician (born 1877)
Johannes Henrik Schiøtz, military officer and historian (born 1884)

See also

References

External links